Here Comes a Chopper is a 1946 mystery detective novel by the British writer Gladys Mitchell. It is the nineteenth in her long-running series featuring the psychoanalyst and amateur detective Mrs Bradley. The title references a line in the nursery rhyme Oranges and Lemons. The plot revolves around a traditional country house mystery involving a man who goes missing only to turn up as a headless corpse.

In a review in the New Statesman, Ralph Partridge observed "Miss Gladys Mitchell’s style of surrealist detection is too fundamentally established to be criticised. In a misguided way she has a touch of genius."

References

Bibliography
 Klein, Kathleen Gregory. Great Women Mystery Writers: Classic to Contemporary. Greenwood Press, 1994.
 Reilly, John M. Twentieth Century Crime & Mystery Writers. Springer, 2015.

1946 British novels
Novels by Gladys Mitchell
British crime novels
British mystery novels
British thriller novels
Novels set in Surrey
Novels set in London
British detective novels
Michael Joseph books